Grand Prix Chantal Biya is a professional road bicycle racing stage race held in Cameroon and sponsored by the Fédération Camerounaise de Cyclisme/Ateba Koungou.  The race is named in honor of Chantal Biya, the First Lady of Cameroon as wife of President Paul Biya.

Winners

References

External links
 Cyclingnews.com: 2006 results

Cycle races in Cameroon
UCI Africa Tour races
Recurring sporting events established in 2001
2001 establishments in Cameroon